The 2016 United States House of Representatives elections were held on November 8, 2016, to elect representatives for all 435 congressional districts across each of the 50 U.S. states to the 115th United States Congress. Non-voting members for the District of Columbia and territories of the United States were also elected. These elections coincided with the election of President Donald Trump, although his party lost seats in both chambers of Congress. The winners of this election served in the 115th Congress, with seats apportioned among the states based on the 2010 United States census. In October 2015, the House elected a new Speaker, Republican Paul Ryan, who was re-elected in the new term. Democrat Nancy Pelosi continued to lead her party as Minority Leader. Elections were also held on the same day for the U.S. Senate, many governors, and other state and local elections.

Democrats gained 6 seats in this election, although Republicans narrowly won the popular vote and won a 241–194 majority. Republicans suffered net losses in both houses of Congress, despite winning the presidency, a first for either party since the 2000 elections. This was also the first election since 2000 in which the winning presidential party lost House seats.

As of 2022, this is the last time Republicans won a majority of seats in Michigan and Pennsylvania, and the most recent election cycle in which Republicans won a House seat in Maine or any state in the New England region.

Results summary

Federal 
Source:  Note: does not include blank and over/under votes which were included in the official results.

Per states

Maps

Retiring incumbents 

Forty-two Representatives declined to seek re-election in 2016, divided into eighteen Democrats and twenty-four Republicans.

Democrats 
Eighteen Democrats retired.

 : Ann Kirkpatrick retired to run for U.S. Senator.
 : Sam Farr retired.
 : Lois Capps retired.
 : Janice Hahn retired to run for the Los Angeles County Board of Supervisors.
 : Loretta Sanchez retired to run for U.S. Senator.
 : John Carney retired to run for Governor of Delaware.
 : Gwen Graham retired.
 : Alan Grayson retired to run for U.S. Senator.
 : Patrick Murphy retired to run for U.S. Senator.
 : Mark Takai died July 20, 2016, having already announced his planned retirement.
 : Tammy Duckworth retired to run for U.S. Senator.
 : Donna Edwards retired to run for U.S. Senator.
 : Chris Van Hollen retired to run for U.S. Senator.
 : Steve Israel retired.
 : Charles Rangel retired.
 : Pedro Pierluisi retired to run for Governor of Puerto Rico.
 : Rubén Hinojosa retired.
 : Jim McDermott retired.

Republicans 
Twenty-four Republicans retired.
 : Matt Salmon retired.
 : Jeff Miller retired.
 : Ander Crenshaw retired.
 : Rich Nugent retired.
 : Curt Clawson retired.
 : Lynn Westmoreland retired.
 : Marlin Stutzman retired to run for U.S. Senator.
 : Todd Young retired to run for U.S. Senator.
 : Ed Whitfield resigned September 6, 2016, having previously announced his planned retirement.
 : Charles Boustany retired to run for U.S. Senator.
 : John Fleming retired to run for U.S. Senator.
 : Dan Benishek retired.
 : Candice Miller retired.
 : John Kline retired.
 : Joe Heck retired to run for U.S. Senator.
 : Chris Gibson retired.
 : Richard Hanna retired.
 : Joe Pitts retired.
 : Stephen Fincher retired.
 : Randy Neugebauer retired.
 : Scott Rigell retired.
 : Robert Hurt retired.
 : Reid Ribble retired.
 : Cynthia Lummis retired.

Incumbents defeated

In primary elections

Democrats 
 : Corrine Brown lost renomination to Al Lawson; the 5th district was redrawn in 2016 due to a court order
 : Chaka Fattah lost renomination to Dwight E. Evans. Subsequently, resigned on June 23, 2016.

Republicans 
 : Tim Huelskamp lost renomination to Roger Marshall.
 : Renee Ellmers lost renomination to fellow incumbent George Holding after court-ordered redistricting forced them into the same district.
 : Randy Forbes lost renomination to Scott Taylor after running in a new district following court-ordered redistricting.

In the general election 
The Democrats had a net gain of five seats, taken from Republicans.

Democrats 
One Democrat lost re-election to a fellow Democrat.
 : Mike Honda (D) lost to Ro Khanna (D).

One Democrat lost re-election to a Republican.
 : Brad Ashford (D) lost to Don Bacon (R).

Republicans 

Six Republicans lost re-election to Democrats.
 : John Mica (R) lost to Stephanie Murphy (D).
 : David Jolly (R) lost to Charlie Crist (D).
 : Bob Dold (R) lost to Brad Schneider (D).
 : Cresent Hardy (R) lost to Ruben Kihuen (D).
 : Frank Guinta (R) lost to Carol Shea-Porter (D).
 : Scott Garrett (R) lost to Josh Gottheimer (D).

Open seats that changed parties 
Democrats had a net gain of one seat in which the incumbent was not on the ballot.

Democratic seats 
One open seat was lost.
 : Patrick Murphy (D) retired to run for Senate. Seat won by Brian Mast (R).

One open seat was lost as a result of redistricting.
 : Gwen Graham (D) retired. Seat won by Neal Dunn (R).

Republican seats 
One open seat was lost.
 : Joe Heck (R) retired to run for Senate. Seat won by Jacky Rosen. (D).

Two open seats were lost as a result of redistricting.
 : Daniel Webster (R) instead ran in the 11th district. Seat won by Val Demings (D).
 : J. Randy Forbes (R) instead ran in the 2nd district. Seat won by Don McEachin (D).

Closest races 
In thirty-five races, the margin of victory was less than 10%.

Election ratings

Primary dates 
This table shows the primary dates for regularly-scheduled elections. It also shows the type of primary. In an "open" primary, any registered voter can vote in any party's primary. In a "closed" primary, only voters registered with a specific party can vote in that party's primary. In a "top-two" primary, all candidates run against each other regardless of party affiliation, and the top two candidates advance to the second round of voting (in Louisiana, a candidate can win the election by winning a majority of the vote in the first round). All of the various other primary types are classified as "hybrid." Alaska in 2008 provides one example of a hybrid primary: the Democratic Party allowed unaffiliated voters to vote in its primary, while the Republican Party only allowed party members to vote in its primary.

RIndicates a state that requires primary run-off elections under certain conditions.

Special elections 
These elections were for the remainder of the term ending January 3, 2017. Sorted by date, then by state, then by district.

|-
| nowrap | 
| John Boehner
| 
| 1990
|  | Incumbent resigned October 31, 2015.New member elected June 7, 2016.Republican hold.
| nowrap |  Warren Davidson (Republican) 76.8%Corey Foister (Democratic) 21.1%James J. Condit Jr. (Green) 2.2%
|-
| nowrap | 
| Chaka Fattah
| 
| 1994
|  | Incumbent resigned June 23, 2016, after being convicted on 23 counts of federal corruption charges.New member elected November 8, 2016.Winner was also elected to the next term, see below.Democratic hold.
| nowrap |  Dwight Evans (Democratic) 90.2%James Jones (Republican) 9.8%

|-
| nowrap | 
| Mark Takai
| 
| 2014
|  | Incumbent died July 20, 2016.New member elected November 8, 2016.Winner was also elected to the next term, see below.Democratic hold.
| nowrap |  Colleen Hanabusa (Democratic) 60.5%Shirlene DelaCruz Ostrov (Republican) 20.6%Other candidates 18.9%

|-
| nowrap | 
| Ed Whitfield
| 
| 1994
|  | Incumbent resigned September 6, 2016.New member elected November 8, 2016.Winner was also elected to the next term, see below.Republican hold.
| nowrap |  James Comer (Republican) 72.2%Samuel L. Gaskins (Democratic) 27.8%

|}

Alabama 

|-
! 
|  | 
| 
| 
| 2013
| Incumbent re-elected.
| nowrap |   (Republican) 96.4%
|-
! 
|  | 
| 
| 
| 2010
| Incumbent re-elected.
| nowrap |   (Republican) 48.8%Nathan Mathis (Democratic) 40.5%
|-
! 
|  | 
| 
| 
| 2002
| Incumbent re-elected.
| nowrap |   (Republican) 66.9%Jesse Smith (Democratic) 32.9%
|-
! 
|  | 
| 
| 
| 1996
| Incumbent re-elected.
| nowrap |   (Republican) 98.5%
|-
! 
|  | 
| 
| 
| 2010
| Incumbent re-elected.
| nowrap |   (Republican) 66.7%Will Boyd (Democratic) 33.2%
|-
! 
|  | 
| 
| 
| 2014
| Incumbent re-elected.
| nowrap |   (Republican) 74.5%David Putman (Democratic) 25.4%
|-
! 
|  | 
| 
| 
| 2010
| Incumbent re-elected.
| nowrap |   (Democratic) 98.4%
|}

Alaska 

|-
! 
|  | 
| Don Young
| 
| 1973 
| Incumbent re-elected.
| nowrap |  Don Young (Republican) 50.3%Steve Lindbeck (Democratic) 36.0%Jim C. McDermott (Libertarian) 10.3%Bernie Souphanavong (Independent) 3.0%
|}

Arizona 

|-
! 
|  | 
| 
| 
| 20082010 2012
|  | Incumbent retired to run for U.S. Senator.New member elected.Democratic hold.
| nowrap |   (Democratic) 50.7%Paul Babeu (Republican) 43.4%Ray Parrish (Green) 6.0%
|-
! 
|  | 
| 
| 
| 2014
| Incumbent re-elected.
| nowrap |   (Republican) 57.0%Matt Heinz (Democratic) 43.0%
|-
! 
|  | 
| 
| 
| 2002
| Incumbent re-elected.
| nowrap |   (Democratic) 98.6%
|-
! 
|  | 
| 
| 
| 2010
| Incumbent re-elected.
| nowrap |   (Republican) 71.5%Mikel Weisser (Democratic) 28.5%
|-
! 
|  | 
| 
| 
| 19942000 2012
|  | Incumbent retired.New member elected.Republican hold.
| nowrap |   (Republican) 64.1%Talia Fuentes (Democratic) 35.9%
|-
! 
|  | 
| 
| 
| 2010
| Incumbent re-elected.
| nowrap |   (Republican) 62.1%John Williamson (Democratic) 37.9%
|-
! 
|  | 
| 
| 
| 2014
| Incumbent re-elected.
| nowrap |   (Democratic) 75.2%Eve Nunez (Republican) 24.7%
|-
! 
|  | 
| 
| 
| 2002
| Incumbent re-elected.
| nowrap |   (Republican) 68.5%Mark Salazar (Green) 31.43%
|-
! 
|  | 
| 
| 
| 2012
| Incumbent re-elected.
| nowrap |   (Democratic) 60.9%Dave Giles (Republican) 39.1%
|}

Arkansas 

|-
! 
|  | 
| 
| 
| 2010
| Incumbent re-elected.
| nowrap |   (Republican) 76.3%Mark West (Libertarian) 23.7%
|-
! 
|  | 
| 
| 
| 2014
| Incumbent re-elected.
| nowrap |   (Republican) 58.4%Dianne Curry (Democratic) 36.8%Chris Hayes (Libertarian) 4.7%
|-
! 
|  | 
| 
| 
| 2010
| Incumbent re-elected.
| nowrap |   (Republican) 77.3%Steve Isaacson (Libertarian) 22.7%
|-
! 
|  | 
| 
| 
| 2014
| Incumbent re-elected.
| nowrap |   (Republican) 74.9%Kerry Hicks (Libertarian) 25.1%
|}

California 

|-
! 
|  | 
| 
| 
| 2012
| Incumbent re-elected.
| nowrap |   (Republican) 59.1%Jim Reed (Democratic) 40.9%
|-
! 
|  | 
| 
| 
| 2012
| Incumbent re-elected.
| nowrap |   (Democratic) 76.9%Dale Mensing (Republican) 23.1%
|-
! 
|  | 
| 
| 
| 2009
| Incumbent re-elected.
| nowrap |   (Democratic) 59.4%Eugene Cleek (Republican) 40.6%
|-
! 
|  | 
| 
| 
| 2008
| Incumbent re-elected.
| nowrap |   (Republican) 62.7%Bob Derlet (Democratic) 37.3%
|-
! 
|  | 
| 
| 
| 1998
| Incumbent re-elected.
| nowrap |   (Democratic) 76.9%Carlos Santamaria (Republican) 23.1%
|-
! 
|  | 
| 
| 
| 2005
| Incumbent re-elected.
| nowrap |   (Democratic) 75.4%Bob Evans (Republican) 24.6%
|-
! 
| 
| 
| 
| 2012
| Incumbent re-elected.
| nowrap |   (Democratic) 51.2%Scott Jones (Republican) 48.8%
|-
! 
|  | 
| 
| 
| 2012
| Incumbent re-elected.
| nowrap |   (Republican) 62.3%Rita Ramirez (Democratic) 37.7%
|-
! 
|  | 
| 
| 
| 2006
| Incumbent re-elected.
| nowrap |   (Democratic) 57.4%Tony Amador (Republican) 42.6%
|-
! 
|  | 
| 
| 
| 2010
| Incumbent re-elected.
| nowrap |   (Republican) 51.7%Michael Eggman (Democratic) 48.3%
|-
! 
|  | 
| 
| 
| 2014
| Incumbent re-elected.
| nowrap |   (Democratic) 72.1%Roger Allen Petersen (Republican) 27.9%
|-
! 
|  | 
| 
| 
| 1987
| Incumbent re-elected.
| nowrap |   (Democratic) 80.9%Preston Picus (No Party Preference) 19.1%
|-
! 
|  | 
| 
| 
| 1998
| Incumbent re-elected.
| nowrap |   (Democratic) 90.8%Sue Caro (Republican) 9.2%
|-
! 
|  | 
| 
| 
| 2008
| Incumbent re-elected.
| nowrap |   (Democratic) 80.9%Angel Cardenas (Republican) 19.1%
|-
! 
|  | 
| 
| 
| 2012
| Incumbent re-elected.
| nowrap |   (Democratic) 73.8%Danny Turner (Republican) 26.2%
|-
! 
|  | 
| 
| 
| 2004
| Incumbent re-elected.
| nowrap |   (Democratic) 58.0%Johnny Tacherra (Republican) 42.0%
|-
! 
|  | 
| 
| 
| 2000
|  | Incumbent lost re-election.New member elected.Democratic hold.
| nowrap |   (Democratic) 61.0%Mike Honda (Democratic) 39.0%
|-
! 
|  | 
| 
| 
| 1992
| Incumbent re-elected.
| nowrap |   (Democratic) 71.1%Richard B. Fox (Republican) 28.9%
|-
! 
|  | 
| 
| 
| 1994
| Incumbent re-elected.
| nowrap |   (Democratic) 73.9%G. Burt Lancaster (Republican) 26.1%
|-
! 
|  | 
| 
| 
| 1993
|  | Incumbent retired.New member elected.Democratic hold.
| nowrap |   (Democratic) 70.8%Casey Lucius (Republican) 29.2%
|-
! 
|  | 
| 
| 
| 2012
| Incumbent re-elected.
| nowrap |   (Republican) 56.7%Emilio Huerta (Democratic) 43.3%
|-
! 
|  | 
| 
| 
| 2002
| Incumbent re-elected.
| nowrap |   (Republican) 67.6%Louie Campos (Democratic) 32.4%
|-
! 
|  | 
| 
| 
| 2006
| Incumbent re-elected.
| nowrap |   (Republican) 69.2%Wendy Reed (Democratic) 30.8%
|-
! 
|  | 
| 
| 
| 1998
|  | Incumbent retired.New member elected.Democratic hold.
| nowrap |   (Democratic) 53.4%Justin Fareed (Republican) 46.6%
|-
! 
|  | 
| 
| 
| 2014
| Incumbent re-elected.
| nowrap |   (Republican) 53.1%Bryan Caforio (Democratic) 46.9%
|-
! 
|  | 
| 
| 
| 2012
| Incumbent re-elected.
| nowrap |   (Democratic) 60.4%Rafael Dagnesses (Republican) 39.6%
|-
! 
|  | 
| 
| 
| 2009
| Incumbent re-elected.
| nowrap |   (Democratic) 67.4%Jack Orswell (Republican) 32.6%
|-
! 
|  | 
| 
| 
| 2000
| Incumbent re-elected.
| nowrap |   (Democratic) 78.0%Lenore Solis (Republican) 22.0%
|-
! 
|  | 
| 
| 
| 2012
| Incumbent re-elected.
| nowrap |   (Democratic) 74.7%Richard Alarcon (Democratic) 25.3%
|-
! 
|  | 
| 
| 
| 1996
| Incumbent re-elected.
| nowrap |   (Democratic) 72.6%Mark Reed (Republican) 27.4%
|-
! 
|  | 
| 
| 
| 2014
| Incumbent re-elected.
| nowrap |   (Democratic) 56.1%Paul Chabot (Republican) 43.9%
|-
! 
|  | 
| 
| 
| 1998
| Incumbent re-elected.
| nowrap |   (Democratic) 61.6%Roger Hernandez (Democratic) 38.4%
|-
! 
|  | 
| 
| 
| 2014
| Incumbent re-elected.
| nowrap |   (Democratic) 66.4%Kenneth Wright (Republican) 33.6%
|-
! 
|  | 
| 
| 
| 1992
| Incumbent re-elected.
| nowrap |   (Democratic) 77.2%Adrienne Edwards (Democratic) 22.8%
|-
! 
|  | 
| 
| 
| 2014
| Incumbent re-elected.
| nowrap |   (Democratic) 72.4%Tyler Fischella (Republican) 27.6%
|-
! 
|  | 
| 
| 
| 2012
| Incumbent re-elected.
| nowrap |   (Democratic) 62.1%Jeff Stone (Republican) 37.9%
|-
! 
|  | 
| 
| 
| 2010
| Incumbent re-elected.
| nowrap |   (Democratic) 81.1%Chris Wiggins (Democratic) 18.9%
|-
! 
|  | 
| 
| 
| 2002
| Incumbent re-elected.
| nowrap |   (Democratic) 70.5%Ryan Downing (Republican) 29.5%
|-
! 
|  | 
| 
| 
| 1992
| Incumbent re-elected.
| nowrap |   (Republican) 57.2%Brett Murdock (Democratic) 42.8%
|-
! 
|  | 
| 
| 
| 1992
| Incumbent re-elected.
| nowrap |   (Democratic) 71.4%Roman Gabriel Gonzalez (No Party Preference) 28.6%
|-
! 
|  | 
| 
| 
| 2012
| Incumbent re-elected.
| nowrap |   (Democratic) 65.0%Doug Shepherd (Republican) 35.0%
|-
! 
|  | 
| 
| 
| 1992
| Incumbent re-elected.
| nowrap |   (Republican) 58.8%Tim Sheridan (Democratic) 41.2%
|-
! 
|  | 
| 
| 
| 1990
| Incumbent re-elected.
| nowrap |   (Democratic) 76.1%Omar Navarro (Republican) 23.9%
|-
! 
|  | 
| 
| 
| 2011
|  | Incumbent retired to run for the Los Angeles County Board of Supervisors.New member elected.Democratic hold.
| nowrap |   (Democratic) 52.2%Isadore Hall III (Democratic) 47.8%
|-
! 
|  | 
| 
| 
| 2014
| Incumbent re-elected.
| nowrap |   (Republican) 58.6%Ron Varasteh (Democratic) 41.4%
|-
! 
|  | 
| 
| 
| 1996
|  | Incumbent retired to run for U.S. Senator.New member elected.Democratic hold.
| nowrap |   (Democratic) 70.0%Bao Nguyen (Democratic) 30.0%
|-
! 
|  | 
| 
| 
| 2012
| Incumbent re-elected.
| nowrap |   (Democratic) 63.7%Andy Whallon (Republican) 36.3%
|-
! 
|  | 
| 
| 
| 1988
| Incumbent re-elected.
| nowrap |   (Republican) 58.3%Suzanne Savary (Democratic) 41.7%
|-
! 
|  | 
| 
| 
| 2000
| Incumbent re-elected.
| nowrap |   (Republican) 50.3%Doug Applegate (Democratic) 49.7%
|-
! 
|  | 
| 
| 
| 2008
| Incumbent re-elected.
| nowrap |   (Republican) 63.5%Patrick Malloy (Democratic) 36.5%
|-
! 
|  | 
| 
| 
| 2012
| Incumbent re-elected.
| nowrap |   (Democratic) 72.8%Juan Hidalgo Jr. (Republican) 27.2%
|-
! 
|  | 
| 
| 
| 2012
| Incumbent re-elected.
| nowrap |   (Democratic) 56.5%Denise Gitsham (Republican) 43.5%
|-
! 
|  | 
| 
| 
| 2000
| Incumbent re-elected.
| nowrap |   (Democratic) 67.0%James Veltmeyer (Republican) 33.0%
|}

Colorado 

|-
! 
|  | 
| 
| 
| 1996
| Incumbent re-elected.
| nowrap |   (Democratic) 67.9%Casper Stockham (Republican) 27.7%Darrell Dinges (Libertarian) 4.4%
|-
! 
|  | 
| 
| 
| 2008
| Incumbent re-elected.
| nowrap |   (Democratic) 56.9%Nic Morse (Republican) 37.2%Richard Longstreth (Libertarian) 5.9%
|-
! 
|  | 
| 
| 
| 2010
| Incumbent re-elected.
| nowrap |   (Republican) 54.6%Gail Schwartz (Democratic) 40.4%Gaylon Kent (Libertarian) 5.0%
|-
! 
|  | 
| 
| 
| 2014
| Incumbent re-elected.
| nowrap |   (Republican) 63.6%Bob Seay (Democratic) 31.5%Bruce Griffith (Libertarian) 4.8%
|-
! 
|  | 
| 
| 
| 2006
| Incumbent re-elected.
| nowrap |   (Republican) 62.3%Misty Plowright (Democratic) 30.8%Mike McRedmond (Libertarian) 6.9%
|-
! 
|  | 
| 
| 
| 2008
| Incumbent re-elected.
| nowrap |   (Republican) 50.9%Morgan Carroll (Democratic) 42.6%Norm Olsen (Libertarian) 5.0%Robert Lee Worthey (Green) 1.5%
|-
! 
|  | 
| 
| 
| 2006
| Incumbent re-elected.
| nowrap |   (Democratic) 55.2%George Athanasopoulos (Republican) 39.8%Martin Buchanan (Libertarian) 5.0%
|}

Connecticut 

|-
! 
|  | 
| 
| 
| 1998
| Incumbent re-elected.
| nowrap |   (Democratic) 64.1%Matthew Corey (Republican) 33.8%Mike DeRosa (Green) 2.11%
|-
! 
|  | 
| 
| 
| 2006
| Incumbent re-elected.
| nowrap |   (Democratic) 63.2%Daria Novak (Republican) 33.7%Dan Reale (Libertarian) 1.5%Jonathan Pelto (Green) 1.6%
|-
! 
|  | 
| 
| 
| 1990
| Incumbent re-elected.
| nowrap |   (Democratic) 69.0%Angel Cadena (Republican) 31.0%
|-
! 
|  | 
| 
| 
| 2008
| Incumbent re-elected.
| nowrap |   (Democratic) 59.9%John Shaban (Republican) 40.1%
|-
! 
|  | 
| 
| 
| 2012
| Incumbent re-elected.
| nowrap |   (Democratic) 58.0%Clay Cope (Republican) 42.0%
|}

Delaware 

|-
! 
|  | 
| John Carney
| 
| 2010
|  | Incumbent retired to run for Governor.New member elected.Democratic hold.
| nowrap |  Lisa Blunt Rochester (Democratic) 55.5%Hans Reigle (Republican) 41.0%Mark Perri (Green) 2.0%Scott Gesty (Libertarian) 1.5%
|}

Florida 

|-
! 
|  | 
| 
| 
| 2001
|  | Incumbent retired.New member elected.Republican hold.
| nowrap |   (Republican) 69.1%Steven Specht (Democratic) 30.9%
|-
! 
|  | 
| 
| 
| 2014
|  | Incumbent retired.New member elected.Republican gain.
| nowrap |   (Republican) 67.3%Walter Dartland (Democratic) 29.9%Rob Lapham (Libertarian) 2.7%
|-
! 
|  | 
| 
| 
| 2012
| Incumbent re-elected.
| nowrap |   (Republican) 56.6%Ken McGurn (Democratic) 39.8%
|-
! 
|  | 
| 
| 
| 2000
|  | Incumbent retired.New member elected.Republican hold.
| nowrap |   (Republican) 70.2%David E. Bruderly (Democratic) 27.6%
|-
! 
|  | 
| 
| 
| 1992
|  | Incumbent lost renomination.New member elected.Democratic hold.
| nowrap |   (Democratic) 64.2%Glo Smith (Republican) 35.8%
|-
! 
|  | 
| 
| 
| 2012
| Incumbent re-elected.
| nowrap |   (Republican) 58.6%Bill McCullough (Democratic) 41.4%
|-
! 
|  | 
| 
| 
| 1992
|  | Incumbent lost re-election.New member elected.Democratic gain.
| nowrap |   (Democratic) 51.5%John Mica (Republican) 48.5%
|-
! 
|  | 
| 
| 
| 2008
| Incumbent re-elected.
| nowrap |   (Republican) 63.1%Corry Westbrook (Democratic) 32.6%
|-
! 
|  | 
| 
| 
| 20082010 2012
|  | Incumbent retired to run for U.S. SenatorNew member elected.Democratic hold.
| nowrap |   (Democratic) 57.5%Wayne Liebnitzky (Republican) 42.5%
|-
! 
|  | 
| colspan=3|None 
|  | New seat.New member elected.Democratic gain.
| nowrap |   (Democratic) 64.9%Thuy Lowe (Republican) 35.1%
|-
!rowspan=2 | 
|rowspan=2  | 
| 
| 
| 2010
|  | Incumbent retired.Republican loss.
| nowrap rowspan=2|   (Republican) 65.4%Dave Koller (Democratic) 31.6%
|-
| Dan Webster
| 
| 2010
| Incumbent re-elected.
|-
! 
|  | 
| 
| 
| 2006
| Incumbent re-elected.
| nowrap |   (Republican) 68.6%Robert Tager (Democratic) 31.4%
|-
! 
|  | 
| 
| 
| 2014
|  | Incumbent lost re-election.New member elected.Democratic gain.
| nowrap |   (Democratic) 51.9%David Jolly (Republican) 48.1%
|-
! 
|  | 
| 
| 
| 2006
| Incumbent re-elected.
| nowrap |   (Democratic) 61.8%Christine Quinn (Republican) 38.2%
|-
! 
|  | 
| 
| 
| 2010
| Incumbent re-elected.
| nowrap |   (Republican) 57.5%Jim Lange (Democratic) 42.5%
|-
! 
|  | 
| 
| 
| 2006
| Incumbent re-elected.
| nowrap |   (Republican) 59.8%Jan Schneider (Democratic) 40.2%
|-
! 
|  | 
| 
| 
| 2008
| Incumbent re-elected.
| nowrap |   (Republican) 61.8%April Freeman (Democratic) 34.2%
|-
! 
|  | 
| 
| 
| 2012
|  | Incumbent retired to run for U.S. Senator.New member elected.Republican gain.
| nowrap |   (Republican) 53.6%Randy Perkins (Democratic) 43.1%
|-
! 
|  | 
| 
| 
| 2014
|  | Incumbent retired.New member elected.Republican hold.
| nowrap |   (Republican) 65.9%Robert Neeld (Democratic) 34.1%
|-
! 
|  | 
| 
| 
| 1992
| Incumbent re-elected.
| nowrap |   (Democratic) 80.3%Gary Stein (Republican) 19.7%
|-
! 
|  | 
| 
| 
| 2012
| Incumbent re-elected.
| nowrap |   (Democratic) 62.7%Paul Spain (Republican) 35.1%
|-
! 
|  | 
| 
| 
| 2010
| Incumbent re-elected.
| nowrap |   (Democratic) 58.9%Andrea Leigh McGee (Republican) 41.1%
|-
! 
|  | 
| 
| 
| 2004
| Incumbent re-elected.
| nowrap |   (Democratic) 56.7%Joe Kaufman (Republican) 40.5%
|-
! 
|  | 
| 
| 
| 2010
| Incumbent re-elected.
| nowrap |   (Democratic) 100%
|-
! 
|  | 
| 
| 
| 2002
| Incumbent re-elected.
| nowrap |   (Republican) 62.4%Alina Valdes (Democratic) 37.6%
|-
! 
| 
| 
| 
| 2014
| Incumbent re-elected.
| nowrap |   (Republican) 53.0%Joe Garcia (Democratic) 41.2%
|-
! 
|  | 
| 
| 
| 1989
| Incumbent re-elected.
| nowrap |   (Republican) 54.9%Scott Fuhrman (Democratic) 45.1%
|}

Georgia 

|-
! 
|  | 
| 
| 
| 2014
| Incumbent re-elected.
| nowrap |   (Republican) 100%
|-
! 
|  | 
| 
| 
| 1992
| Incumbent re-elected.
| nowrap |   (Democratic) 61.2%Greg Duke (Republican) 38.8%
|-
! 
|  | 
| 
| 
| 2004
|  | Incumbent retired.New member elected.Republican hold.
| nowrap |   (Republican) 68.4%Angela Pendley (Democratic) 31.6%
|-
! 
|  | 
| 
| 
| 2006
| Incumbent re-elected.
| nowrap |   (Democratic) 75.7%Victor Armendariz (Republican) 24.3%
|-
! 
|  | 
| 
| 
| 1986
| Incumbent re-elected.
| nowrap |   (Democratic) 84.4%Douglas Bell (Republican) 15.6%
|-
! 
|  | 
| 
| 
| 2004
| Incumbent re-elected.
| nowrap |   (Republican) 61.7%Rodney Stooksbury (Democratic) 38.3%
|-
! 
|  | 
| 
| 
| 2010
| Incumbent re-elected.
| nowrap |   (Republican) 60.4%Rashid Malik (Democratic) 39.6%
|-
! 
|  | 
| 
| 
| 2010
| Incumbent re-elected.
| nowrap |   (Republican) 67.6%James Harris (Democratic) 32.4%
|-
! 
|  | 
| 
| 
| 2012
| Incumbent re-elected.
| nowrap |   (Republican) 100%
|-
! 
|  | 
| 
| 
| 2014
| Incumbent re-elected.
| nowrap |   (Republican) 100%
|-
! 
|  | 
| 
| 
| 2014
| Incumbent re-elected.
| nowrap |   (Republican) 67.4%Don Wilson (Democratic) 32.6%
|-
! 
|  | 
| 
| 
| 2014
| Incumbent re-elected.
| nowrap |   (Republican) 61.6%Tricia McCracken (Democratic) 38.4%
|-
! 
|  | 
| 
| 
| 2002
| Incumbent re-elected.
| nowrap |   (Democratic) 100%
|-
! 
|  | 
| 
| 
| 2010
| Incumbent re-elected.
| nowrap |   (Republican) 100%
|}

Hawaii 

|-
! 
|  | 
| colspan=3 |Vacant
|  | Incumbent Mark Takai (D) died on July 20, 2016.New member elected.Democratic hold.Winner was also elected to fill unexpired term, see above.
| nowrap |   (Democratic) 71.9%Shirlene D. Ostrov (Republican) 22.7%Alan Yim (Libertarian) 3.3%
|-
! 
|  | 
| 
| 
| 2012
| Incumbent re-elected.
| nowrap |   (Democratic) 81.2%Angela Kaaihue (Republican) 18.8%
|}

Idaho 

|-
! 
|  | 
| 
| 
| 2010
| Incumbent re-elected.
| nowrap |   (Republican) 68.2%James Piotrowski (Democratic) 31.8%
|-
! 
|  | 
| 
| 
| 1998
| Incumbent re-elected.
| nowrap |   (Republican) 62.9%Jennifer Martinez (Democratic) 29.4%
|}

Illinois 

|-
! 
|  | 
| 
| 
| 1992
| Incumbent re-elected.
| nowrap |   (Democratic) 74.1%August Deuser (Republican) 25.9%
|-
! 
|  | 
| 
| 
| 2013
| Incumbent re-elected.
| nowrap |   (Democratic) 79.8%John Morrow (Republican) 20.2%
|-
! 
|  | 
| 
| 
| 2004
| Incumbent re-elected.
| nowrap |   (Democratic) 100%
|-
! 
|  | 
| 
| 
| 1992
| Incumbent re-elected.
| nowrap |   (Democratic) 100%
|-
! 
|  | 
| 
| 
| 2008
| Incumbent re-elected.
| nowrap |   (Democratic) 67.8%Vince Kolber (Republican) 27.5%
|-
! 
|  | 
| 
| 
| 2006
| Incumbent re-elected.
| nowrap |   (Republican) 59.2%Amanda Howland (Democratic) 40.8%
|-
! 
|  | 
| 
| 
| 1996
| Incumbent re-elected.
| nowrap |   (Democratic) 84.2%Jeffrey Leef (Republican) 15.8%
|-
! 
|  | 
| 
| 
| 2012
|  | Incumbent retired to run for U.S. Senator.New member elected.Democratic hold.
| nowrap |   (Democratic) 58.3%Pete DiCianni (Republican) 41.7%
|-
! 
|  | 
| 
| 
| 1998
| Incumbent re-elected.
| nowrap |   (Democratic) 66.5%Joan McCarthy Lasonde (Republican) 33.5%
|-
! 
|  | 
| 
| 
| 20102012 2014
|  | Incumbent lost re-election.New member elected.Democratic gain.
| nowrap |   (Democratic) 52.6%Bob Dold (Republican) 47.4%
|-
! 
|  | 
| 
| 
| 2008 2010 2012
| Incumbent re-elected.
| nowrap |   (Democratic) 60.4%Tonia Khouri (Republican) 39.6%
|-
! 
| 
| 
| 
| 2014
| Incumbent re-elected.
| nowrap |   (Republican) 54.3%C.J. Baricevic (Democratic) 39.7%Paula Bradshaw (Green) 6.0%
|-
! 
| 
| 
| 
| 2012
| Incumbent re-elected.
| nowrap |   (Republican) 59.7%Mark Wicklund (Democratic) 40.3%
|-
! 
|  | 
| 
| 
| 2010
| Incumbent re-elected.
| nowrap |   (Republican) 59.3%Jim Walz (Democratic) 40.7%
|-
! 
|  | 
| 
| 
| 1996
| Incumbent re-elected.
| nowrap |   (Republican) 100%
|-
! 
|  | 
| 
| 
| 2010
| Incumbent re-elected.
| nowrap |   (Republican) 99.9%
|-
! 
|  | 
| 
| 
| 2012
| Incumbent re-elected.
| nowrap |   (Democratic) 60.3%Patrick Harlan (Republican) 39.7%
|-
! 
|  | 
| 
| 
| 2015
| Incumbent re-elected.
| nowrap |   (Republican) 72.1%Junius Rodriguez (Democratic) 27.9%
|}

Indiana 

|-
! 
|  | 
| 
| 
| 1984
| Incumbent re-elected.
| nowrap |   (Democratic) 81.5%Donna Dunn (Libertarian) 18.5%
|-
! 
|  | 
| 
| 
| 2012
| Incumbent re-elected.
| nowrap |   (Republican) 59.3%Lynn Coleman (Democratic) 36.9%
|-
! 
|  | 
| 
| 
| 2010
|  | Incumbent retired to run for U.S. Senate.New member elected.Republican hold.
| nowrap |   (Republican) 70.1%Tommy Schrader (Democratic) 23.0%Pepper Snyder (Libertarian) 6.9%
|-
! 
|  | 
| 
| 
| 2010
| Incumbent re-elected.
| nowrap |   (Republican) 64.6%John Dale (Democratic) 30.5%Steven Mayoras (Libertarian) 4.9%
|-
! 
|  | 
| 
| 
| 2012
| Incumbent re-elected.
| nowrap |   (Republican) 61.5%Angela Demaree (Democratic) 34.3%Matthew Wittlief (Libertarian) 4.2%
|-
! 
|  | 
| 
| 
| 2012
| Incumbent re-elected.
| nowrap |   (Republican) 69.1%Barry Welsh (Democratic) 26.7%Rich Turvey (Libertarian) 4.2%
|-
! 
|  | 
| 
| 
| 2008
| Incumbent re-elected.
| nowrap |   (Democratic) 60.0%Cat Ping (Republican) 35.7%Drew Thompson (Libertarian) 4.3%
|-
! 
|  | 
| 
| 
| 2010
| Incumbent re-elected.
| nowrap |   (Republican) 63.7%Ron Drake (Democratic) 31.7%Andrew Horning (Libertarian) 4.6%
|-
! 
|  | 
| 
| 
| 2010
|  | Incumbent retired to run for U.S. Senate.New member elected.Republican hold.
| nowrap |   (Republican) 54.1%Shelli Yoder (Democratic) 40.5%Russell Brooksbank (Libertarian) 5.4%
|}

Iowa 

|-
! 
|  | 
| 
| 
| 2014
| Incumbent re-elected.
| nowrap |   (Republican) 53.8%Monica Vernon (Democratic) 46.2%
|-
! 
|  | 
| 
| 
| 2006
| Incumbent re-elected.
| nowrap |   (Democratic) 53.7%Christopher Peters (Republican) 46.3%
|-
! 
| 
| 
| 
| 2014
| Incumbent re-elected.
| nowrap |   (Republican) 53.5%Jim Mowrer (Democratic) 39.8%Bryan Jack Holder (Libertarian) 3.9%
|-
! 
|  | 
| 
| 
| 2002
| Incumbent re-elected.
| nowrap |   (Republican) 61.3%Kim Weaver (Democratic) 38.7%
|}

Kansas 

|-
! 
|  | 
| 
| 
| 2010
|  | Incumbent lost renomination.New member elected.Republican hold.
| nowrap |   (Republican) 65.8%Alan LaPolice (Independent) 26.2%Kerry Burt (Libertarian) 7.5%
|-
! 
|  | 
| 
| 
| 2008
| Incumbent re-elected.
| nowrap |   (Republican) 60.9%Britani Potter (Democratic) 32.5%James Houston Bales (Libertarian) 6.5%
|-
! 
|  | 
| 
| 
| 2010
| Incumbent re-elected.
| nowrap |   (Republican) 51.3%Jay Sidie (Democratic) 40.6%Steven Hohe (Libertarian) 8.0%
|-
! 
|  | 
| 
| 
| 2010
| Incumbent re-elected.
| nowrap |   (Republican) 61.6%Dan Giroux (Democratic) 29.6%Gordon J. Bakken (Libertarian) 2.8%
|}

Kentucky 

|-
! 
|  | 
| colspan=3 | Vacant
|  | Incumbent Ed Whitfield (R) resigned September 6, 2016.New member elected.Republican hold.Winner was also elected to fill unexpired term, see above.
| nowrap |   (Republican) 72.6%Sam Gaskins (Democratic) 27.4%
|-
! 
|  | 
| 
| 
| 2008
| Incumbent re-elected.
| nowrap |   (Republican) 100%
|-
! 
|  | 
| 
| 
| 2006
| Incumbent re-elected.
| nowrap |   (Democratic) 63.5%Harold Bratcher (Republican) 36.5%
|-
! 
|  | 
| 
| 
| 2012
| Incumbent re-elected.
| nowrap |   (Republican) 71.3%Calvin Sidle (Democratic) 28.7%
|-
! 
|  | 
| 
| 
| 1980
| Incumbent re-elected.
| nowrap |   (Republican) 100%
|-
! 
|  | 
| 
| 
| 2012
| Incumbent re-elected.
| nowrap |   (Republican) 61.1%Nancy Jo Kemper (Democratic) 38.9%
|}

Louisiana 

|-
! 
|  | 
| 
| 
| 2008
| Incumbent re-elected.
| nowrap |   (Republican) 74.6%Lee Ann Dugas (Democratic) 12.8%Danil Ezekiel Faust (Democratic) 3.9%Howard Kearney (Libertarian) 3%Joseph "Joe" Swider (Democratic) 2.8%
|-
! 
|  | 
| 
| 
| 2010
| Incumbent re-elected.
| nowrap |   (Democratic) 69.8%Kip Holden (Democratic) 20.1%Kenneth Cutno (Democratic) 10.1%
|-
! 
|  | 
| 
| 
| 2004
|  | Incumbent retired to run for U.S. Senate.New member elected.Republican hold.
| nowrap |   (Republican) 56.1%Scott Angelle (Republican) 43.9%
|-
! 
|  | 
| 
| 
| 2008
|  | Incumbent retired to run for U.S. Senate.New member elected.Republican hold.
| nowrap |   (Republican) 65.23%Marshall Jones (Democratic) 34.77%
|-
! 
|  | 
| 
| 
| 2014
| Incumbent re-elected.
| nowrap |   (Republican) 81.6%Billy Burkette (Republican) 18.4%
|-
! 
|  | 
| 
| 
| 2014
| Incumbent re-elected.
| nowrap |   (Republican) 62.7%Richard Lieberman (Democratic) 14.9%Robert Lamar "Bob" Bell (Republican) 10.1%Jermaine Sampson (Democratic) 9.0%Richard Fontanesi (Libertarian) 2%
|}

Maine 

|-
! 
|  | 
| 
| 
| 2008
| Incumbent re-elected.
| nowrap |   (Democratic) 58.0%Mark Holbrook (Republican) 42.0%
|-
! 
|  | 
| 
| 
| 2014
| Incumbent re-elected.
| nowrap |   (Republican) 54.8%Emily Cain (Democratic) 45.2%
|}

Maryland 

|-
! 
|  | 
| 
| 
| 2010
| Incumbent re-elected.
| nowrap |   (Republican) 67.0%Joe Werner (Democratic) 28.6%Matt Beers (Libertarian) 4.2%
|-
! 
|  | 
| 
| 
| 2002
| Incumbent re-elected.
| nowrap |   (Democratic) 62.1%Pat McDonough (Republican) 33.1%Kristin Kasprzak (Libertarian) 4.6%
|-
! 
|  | 
| 
| 
| 2006
| Incumbent re-elected.
| nowrap |   (Democratic) 63.2%Mark Plaster (Republican) 33.9%Eze Nnabu (Green) 2.8%
|-
! 
|  | 
| 
| 
| 2008
|  | Incumbent retired to run for U.S. Senator.New member elected.Democratic hold.
| nowrap |   (Democratic) 74.1%George McDermott (Republican) 21.4%Ben Krause (Libertarian) 1.8%Kamesha Clark (Green) 2.6%
|-
! 
|  | 
| 
| 
| 1981
| Incumbent re-elected.
| nowrap |   (Democratic) 67.4%Mark Arness (Republican) 29.4%Jason Summers (Libertarian) 3.1%
|-
! 
|  | 
| 
| 
| 2012
| Incumbent re-elected.
| nowrap |   (Democratic) 56.0%Amie Hoeber (Republican) 40.1%David Howser (Libertarian) 2.1%George Gluck (Green) 1.8%
|-
! 
|  | 
| 
| 
| 1996
| Incumbent re-elected.
| nowrap |   (Democratic) 74.9%Corrogan Vaughn (Republican) 21.8%Myles Hoenig (Green) 3.0%
|-
! 
|  | 
| 
| 
| 2002
|  | Incumbent retired to run for U.S. Senator.New member elected.Democratic hold.
| nowrap |   (Democratic) 60.6%Dan Cox (Republican) 34.2%Jasen Wunder (Libertarian) 2.0%Nancy Wallace (Green) 3.1%
|}

Massachusetts 

|-
! 
|  | 
| 
| 
| 1988
| Incumbent re-elected.
| nowrap |   (Democratic) 73.3%Frederick Mayock (Independent) 17.9%Thomas Simmons (Libertarian) 8.6%
|-
! 
|  | 
| 
| 
| 1996
| Incumbent re-elected.
| nowrap |   (Democratic) 98.2%
|-
! 
|  | 
| 
| 
| 2007
| Incumbent re-elected.
| nowrap |   (Democratic) 68.7%Ann Wofford (Republican) 31.2%
|-
! 
|  | 
| 
| 
| 2012
| Incumbent re-elected.
| nowrap |   (Democratic) 70.1%David Rosa (Republican) 29.8%
|-
! 
|  | 
| 
| 
| 2013
| Incumbent re-elected.
| nowrap |   (Democratic) 98.6%
|-
! 
|  | 
| 
| 
| 2014
| Incumbent re-elected.
| nowrap |   (Democratic) 98.4%
|-
! 
|  | 
| 
| 
| 1998
| Incumbent re-elected.
| nowrap |   (Democratic) 98.6%
|-
! 
|  | 
| 
| 
| 2001
| Incumbent re-elected.
| nowrap |   (Democratic) 72.4%William Burke (Republican) 27.5%
|-
! 
|  | 
| 
| 
| 2010
| Incumbent re-elected.
| nowrap |   (Democratic) 55.7%Mark Alliegro (Republican) 33.6%Paul Harrington (Independent) 6.9%
|}

Michigan 

|-
! 
|  | 
| 
| 
| 2010
|  | Incumbent retired.New member elected.Republican hold.
| nowrap |   (Republican) 54.9%Lon Johnson (Democratic) 40.1%Diane Bostow (Libertarian) 3.7%Ellis Boal (Green) 1.3%
|-
! 
|  | 
| 
| 
| 2010
| Incumbent re-elected.
| nowrap |   (Republican) 62.6%Dennis B. Murphy (Democratic) 32.5%Erwin J. Haas (Libertarian) 2.4%Matthew Brady (Green) 1.6%
|-
! 
|  | 
| 
| 
| 2010
| Incumbent re-elected.
| nowrap |   (Republican) 59.5%Douglas Smith (Democratic) 37.5%
|-
! 
|  | 
| 
| 
| 2014
| Incumbent re-elected.
| nowrap |   (Republican) 61.6%Debra Freidell Wirth (Democratic) 32.1%Leonard Schwartz (Libertarian) 2.7%Jordan Salvi (Green) 1.3%
|-
! 
|  | 
| 
| 
| 2012
| Incumbent re-elected.
| nowrap |   (Democratic) 61.2%Allen Hardwick (Republican) 35.1%Steve Sluka (Libertarian) 2.2%Harley Mikkelson (Green) 1.5%
|-
! 
|  | 
| 
| 
| 1986
| Incumbent re-elected.
| nowrap |   (Republican) 58.7%Paul Clements (Democratic) 36.4%Lorence Wenke (Libertarian) 4.9%
|-
! 
|  | 
| 
| 
| 20062008 2010
| Incumbent re-elected.
| nowrap |   (Republican) 55.0%Gretchen Driskell (Democratic) 40.0%Kenneth L. Proctor (Libertarian) 4.9%
|-
! 
|  | 
| 
| 
| 2014
| Incumbent re-elected.
| nowrap |   (Republican) 56.0%Suzanna Shkreli (Democratic) 39.2%Jeff Wood (Libertarian) 2.6%Maria Green (Green) 1.6%
|-
! 
|  | 
| 
| 
| 1982
| Incumbent re-elected.
| nowrap |   (Democratic) 57.9%Christopher Morse (Republican) 37.4%Matt Orlando (Libertarian) 2.8%John McDermott (Green) 1.9%
|-
! 
|  | 
| 
| 
| 2002
|  | Incumbent retired.New member elected.Republican hold.
| nowrap |   (Republican) 63.1%Frank Accavitti Jr. (Democratic) 32.3%Lisa Lane Gioia (Libertarian) 3.1%Benjamin Nofs (Green) 1.5%
|-
! 
|  | 
| 
| 
| 2014
| Incumbent re-elected.
| nowrap |   (Republican) 52.9%Anil Kumar (Democratic) 40.2%Jonathan Osment (Libertarian) 2.5%Kerry Bentivolio (Independent) 4.4%
|-
! 
|  | 
| 
| 
| 2014
| Incumbent re-elected.
| nowrap |   (Democratic) 64.3%Jeff Jones (Republican) 29.3%Tom Bagwell (Libertarian) 2.3%Dylan Calewarts (Green) 1.3%
|-
! 
|  | 
| 
| 
| 1964
| Incumbent re-elected.
| nowrap |   (Democratic) 77.1%Jeff Gorman (Republican) 15.7%Tiffany Hayden (Libertarian) 3.8%
|-
! 
|  | 
| 
| 
| 2014
| Incumbent re-elected.
| nowrap |   (Democratic) 78.5%Howard Klausner (Republican) 18.7%Gregory Creswell (Libertarian) 1.6%Marcia Squier (Green) 1.2%
|}

Minnesota 

|-
! 
|  | 
| 
| 
| 2006
| Incumbent re-elected.
| nowrap |   (Democratic) 50.3%Jim Hagedorn (Republican) 49.6%
|-
! 
|  | 
| 
| 
| 2002
|  | Incumbent retired.New member elected.Republican hold.
| nowrap |   (Republican) 47%Angie Craig (Democratic) 45.2%
|-
! 
|  | 
| 
| 
| 2008
| Incumbent re-elected.
| nowrap |   (Republican) 56.7%Terri Bonoff (Democratic) 43%
|-
! 
|  | 
| 
| 
| 2000
| Incumbent re-elected.
| nowrap |   (Democratic) 57.8%Greg Ryan (Republican) 34.4%Susan Sindt (Legal Marijuana Now) 7.7%
|-
! 
|  | 
| 
| 
| 2006
| Incumbent re-elected.
| nowrap |   (Democratic) 69.1%Frank Nelson Drake (Republican) 22.3%Dennis Schuller (Legal Marijuana Now) 8.5%
|-
! 
|  | 
| 
| 
| 2014
| Incumbent re-elected.
| nowrap |   (Republican) 65.6%David Snyder (Democratic) 34.3%
|-
! 
|  | 
| 
| 
| 1990
| Incumbent re-elected.
| nowrap |   (Democratic) 52.5%Dave Hughes (Republican) 47.4%
|-
! 
|  | 
| 
| 
| 19741980 2012
| Incumbent re-elected.
| nowrap |   (Democratic) 50.2%Stewart Mills (Republican) 49.6%
|}

Mississippi 

|-
! 
|  | 
| 
| 
| 2015
| Incumbent re-elected.
| nowrap |   (Republican) 68.7%Jacob Owens (Democratic) 27.9%Chase Wilson (Libertarian) 2.1%
|-
! 
|  | 
| 
| 
| 1993
| Incumbent re-elected.
| nowrap |   (Democratic) 67.1%John Bouie II (Republican) 29.1%
|-
! 
|  | 
| 
| 
| 2008
| Incumbent re-elected.
| nowrap |   (Republican) 66.2%Dennis Quinn (Democratic) 30.4%
|-
! 
|  | 
| 
| 
| 2010
| Incumbent re-elected.
| nowrap |   (Republican) 65.0%Mark Gladney (Democratic) 27.8%Ric McCluskey (Libertarian) 5.3%
|}

Missouri 

|-
! 
|  | 
| 
| 
| 2000
| Incumbent re-elected.
| nowrap |   (Democratic) 75.5%Steven G. Bailey (Republican) 20.0%Robb Cunningham (Libertarian) 4.6%
|-
! 
|  | 
| 
| 
| 2012
| Incumbent re-elected.
| nowrap |   (Republican) 58.5%Bill Otto (Democratic) 37.7%Jim Higgins (Libertarian) 2.9%
|-
! 
|  | 
| 
| 
| 2008
| Incumbent re-elected.
| nowrap |   (Republican) 67.8%Kevin Miller (Democratic) 27.9%Dan Hogan (Libertarian) 3.3%
|-
! 
|  | 
| 
| 
| 2010
| Incumbent re-elected.
| nowrap |   (Republican) 67.8%Gordon Christensen (Democratic) 27.8%Mark Bliss (Libertarian) 4.3%
|-
! 
|  | 
| 
| 
| 2004
| Incumbent re-elected.
| nowrap |   (Democratic) 58.8%Jacob Turk (Republican) 38.2%Roy Welborn (Libertarian) 3.0%
|-
! 
|  | 
| 
| 
| 2000
| Incumbent re-elected.
| nowrap |   (Republican) 68.0%David Blackwell (Democratic) 28.4%Russ Monchil (Libertarian) 2.3%
|-
! 
|  | 
| 
| 
| 2010
| Incumbent re-elected.
| nowrap |   (Republican) 67.5%Genevieve Williams (Democratic) 27.4%Benjamin Brixey (Libertarian) 5.1%
|-
! 
|  | 
| 
| 
| 2013
| Incumbent re-elected.
| nowrap |   (Republican) 74.4%Dave Cowell (Democratic) 22.7%Jonathan Shell (Libertarian) 2.9%
|}

Montana 

|-
! 
|  | 
| Ryan Zinke
| 
| 2014
| Incumbent re-elected.
| nowrap |   (Republican) 56.2%Denise Juneau (Democratic) 40.5%Rick Breckenridge (Libertarian) 3.3%
|}

Nebraska 

|-
! 
|  | 
| 
| 
| 2004
| Incumbent re-elected.
| nowrap |   (Republican) 69.5%Daniel Wik (Democratic) 30.5%
|-
! 
|  | 
| 
| 
| 2014
|  | Incumbent lost re-election.New member elected.Republican gain.
| nowrap |   (Republican) 48.9%Brad Ashford (Democratic) 47.7%Steven Laird (Libertarian) 3.3%
|-
! 
|  | 
| 
| 
| 2006
| Incumbent re-elected.
| nowrap |   (Republican) 100%
|}

Nevada 

|-
! 
|  | 
| 
| 
| 20082010 2012
| Incumbent re-elected.
| nowrap |   (Democratic) 61.9%Mary Perry (Republican) 28.8%
|-
! 
|  | 
| 
| 
| 2011
| Incumbent re-elected.
| nowrap |   (Republican) 58.3%Chip Evans (Democratic) 36.9%
|-
! 
| 
| 
| 
| 2010
|  | Incumbent retired to run for U.S. Senator.New member elected.Democratic gain.
| nowrap |   (Democratic) 47.2%Danny Tarkanian (Republican) 46.0%
|-
! 
|  | 
| 
| 
| 2014
|  | Incumbent lost re-election.New member elected.Democratic gain.
| nowrap |   (Democratic) 48.5%Cresent Hardy (Republican) 44.5%Steve Brown (Libertarian) 3.8%
|}

New Hampshire 

|-
! 
|  | 
| 
| 
| 20102012 2014
|  | Incumbent lost re-election.New member elected.Democratic gain.
| nowrap |   (Democratic) 44.3%Frank Guinta (Republican) 43.0%
|-
! 
|  | 
| 
| 
| 2012
| Incumbent re-elected.
| nowrap |   (Democratic) 49.8%Jim Lawrence (Republican) 45.3%
|}

New Jersey 

|-
! 
|  | 
| 
| 
| 2014
| Incumbent re-elected.
| nowrap |   (Democratic) 60.0%Bob Patterson (Republican) 36.8%
|-
! 
|  | 
| 
| 
| 1994
| Incumbent re-elected.
| nowrap |   (Republican) 59.2%David Cole (Democratic) 37.2%John Ordille (Libertarian) 1.3%
|-
! 
|  | 
| 
| 
| 2014
| Incumbent re-elected.
| nowrap |   (Republican) 59.3%Fred LaVergne (Democratic) 38.9%
|-
! 
|  | 
| 
| 
| 1980
| Incumbent re-elected.
| nowrap |   (Republican) 63.7%Lorna Phillipson (Democratic) 33.5%Jeremy Marcus (Libertarian) 1.0%
|-
! 
|  | 
| 
| 
| 2002
| |Incumbent lost re-election.New member elected.Democratic gain.
| nowrap |   (Democratic) 51.1%Scott Garrett (Republican) 46.7%Claudio Belusic (Libertarian) 2.2%
|-
! 
|  | 
| 
| 
| 1988
| Incumbent re-elected.
| nowrap |   (Democratic) 63.7%Brent Sonnek-Schmelz (Republican) 34.9%
|-
! 
|  | 
| 
| 
| 2008
| Incumbent re-elected.
| nowrap |   (Republican) 54.1%Peter Jacob (Democratic) 43.1%Dan O'Neill (Libertarian) 1.6%
|-
! 
|  | 
| 
| 
| 2006
| Incumbent re-elected.
| nowrap |   (Democratic) 77.0%Agha Khan (Republican) 18.5%Dan Delaney (Libertarian) 2.0%
|-
! 
|  | 
| 
| 
| 1996
| Incumbent re-elected.
| nowrap |   (Democratic) 69.7%Hector Castillo (Republican) 28.0%Diego Rivera (Libertarian) 1.4%
|-
! 
|  | 
| 
| 
| 2012
| Incumbent re-elected.
| nowrap |   (Democratic) 85.7%David Pinckney (Republican) 11.9%
|-
! 
|  | 
| 
| 
| 1994
| Incumbent re-elected.
| nowrap |   (Republican) 58.0%Joseph Wenzel (Democratic) 38.9%Jeff Hetrick (Libertarian) 1.0%
|-
! 
|  | 
| 
| 
| 2014
| Incumbent re-elected.
| nowrap |   (Democratic) 62.9%Steven Uccio (Republican) 32.0%
|}

New Mexico 

|-
! 
|  | 
| 
| 
| 2012
| Incumbent re-elected
| nowrap |   (Democratic) 65.1%Richard Priem (Republican) 34.9%
|-
! 
|  | 
| 
| 
| 20022008 2010
| Incumbent re-elected
| nowrap |   (Republican) 62.7%Merrie Lee Soules (Democratic) 37.3%
|-
! 
|  | 
| 
| 
| 2008
| Incumbent re-elected
| nowrap |   (Democratic) 62.4%Michael Romero (Republican) 37.6%
|}

New York 

|-
! 
|  | 
| 
| 
| 2014
| Incumbent re-elected
| nowrap |   (Republican) 58.9%Anna Throne-Holst (Democratic) 41.0%
|-
! 
|  | 
| 
| 
| 1992
| Incumbent re-elected
| nowrap |   (Republican) 62.4%DuWayne Gregory (Democratic) 37.5%
|-
! 
| 
| 
| 
| 2000
|  | Incumbent retired.New member elected.Democratic hold.
| nowrap |   (Democratic) 52.8%Jack Martins (Republican) 47.2%
|-
! 
|  | 
| 
| 
| 2014
| Incumbent re-elected
| nowrap |   (Democratic) 59.5%David Gurfein (Republican) 40.4%
|-
! 
|  | 
| 
| 
| 1998
| Incumbent re-elected
| nowrap |   (Democratic) 85.4%Michael O'Reilly (Republican) 13.0%Frank Francois (Green) 1.4%
|-
! 
|  | 
| 
| 
| 2012
| Incumbent re-elected
| nowrap |   (Democratic) 72.1%Danniel S. Maio (Republican) 26.7%
|-
! 
|  | 
| 
| 
| 1992
| Incumbent re-elected
| nowrap |   (Democratic) 90.7%Allan Romaguera (Republican) 9.2%
|-
! 
|  | 
| 
| 
| 2012
| Incumbent re-elected
| nowrap |   (Democratic) 93.2%Daniel Cavanagh (Conservative) 6.7%
|-
! 
|  | 
| 
| 
| 2006
| Incumbent re-elected
| nowrap |   (Democratic) 92.3%
|-
! 
|  | 
| 
| 
| 1992
| Incumbent re-elected
| nowrap |   (Democratic) 78.0%Phillip Rosenthal (Republican) 21.9%
|-
! 
|  | 
| 
| 
| 2015
| Incumbent re-elected
| nowrap |   (Republican) 61.5%Richard Reichard (Democratic) 36.7%Henry Bardel (Green) 1.5%
|-
! 
|  | 
| 
| 
| 1992
| Incumbent re-elected
| nowrap |   (Democratic) 83.1%Robert Ardini (Republican) 16.8%
|-
! 
|  | 
| 
| 
| 1970
|  | Incumbent retired.New member elected/Democratic hold.
| nowrap |   (Democratic) 88.6%Robert A. Evans Jr. (Republican) 6.9%Daniel Rivera (Green) 3.2%
|-
! 
|  | 
| 
| 
| 1998
| Incumbent re-elected
| nowrap |   (Democratic) 82.8%Frank Spotorno (Republican) 17.1%
|-
! 
|  | 
| 
| 
| 1990
| Incumbent re-elected
| nowrap |   (Democratic) 95.2%Alejandro Vega (Republican) 3.5%
|-
! 
|  | 
| 
| 
| 1988
| Incumbent re-elected
| nowrap |   (Democratic) 94.4%
|-
! 
|  | 
| 
| 
| 1988
| Incumbent re-elected
| nowrap |   (Democratic) 99.1%
|-
! 
| 
| 
| 
| 2012
| Incumbent re-elected
| nowrap |   (Democratic) 55.6%Phil Oliva (Republican) 44.4%
|-
! 
|  | 
| 
| 
| 2010
|  | Incumbent retired.New member elected.Republican hold.
| nowrap |   (Republican) 54.2%Zephyr Teachout (Democratic) 45.7%
|-
! 
|  | 
| 
| 
| 2008
| Incumbent re-elected
| nowrap |   (Democratic) 67.9%Francis J. Vitollo (Republican) 32.1%
|-
! 
| 
| 
| 
| 2014
| Incumbent re-elected
| nowrap |   (Republican) 65.3%Mike Derrick (Democratic) 30.1%Matt Funiciello (Green) 4.6%
|-
! 
|  | 
| 
| 
| 2010
|  | Incumbent retired.New member elected.Republican hold.
| nowrap |   (Republican) 46.5%Kim Myers (Democratic) 41.0%Martin Babinec (Reform) 11.8%
|-
! 
|  | 
| 
| 
| 2010 
| Incumbent re-elected
| nowrap |   (Republican) 57.6%John Plumb (Democratic) 42.4%
|-
! 
|  | 
| 
| 
| 2014
| Incumbent re-elected
| nowrap |   (Republican) 60.5%Colleen Deacon (Democratic) 39.4%
|-
! 
|  | 
| 
| 
| 1986
| Incumbent re-elected
| nowrap |   (Democratic) 56.1%Mark Assini (Republican) 43.8%
|-
! 
|  | 
| 
| 
| 2004
| Incumbent re-elected
| nowrap |   (Democratic) 74.6%Shelly Shratz (Republican) 25.4%
|-
! 
|  | 
| 
| 
| 2012
| Incumbent re-elected
| nowrap |   (Republican) 67.2%Diana Kastenbaum (Democratic) 32.8%
|}

North Carolina 

|-
! 
|  | 
| 
| 
| 2004
| Incumbent re-elected.
| nowrap |   (Democratic) 68.6%H. Powell Dew (Republican) 29.0%J. J. Summerell (Libertarian) 2.4%
|-
! rowspan=2 | 
| rowspan=2  | 
| 
| 
| 2010
|  | Incumbent lost renomination.Republican loss.
| rowspan=2 nowrap |   (Republican) 56.7%John McNeil (Democratic) 43.3%
|-
| George Holding
| 
| 2012
| Incumbent re-elected.

|-
! 
|  | 
| 
| 
| 1994
| Incumbent re-elected.
| nowrap |   (Republican) 67.2%Ernest Reeves (Democratic) 32.8%
|-
! 
|  | 
| 
| 
| 19861994 1996
| Incumbent re-elected.
| nowrap |   (Democratic) 68.2%Sue Googe (Republican) 31.8%
|-
! 
|  | 
| 
| 
| 2004
| Incumbent re-elected.
| nowrap |   (Republican) 58.4%Josh Brannon (Democratic) 41.6%
|-
! 
|  | 
| 
| 
| 2014
| Incumbent re-elected.
| nowrap |   (Republican) 59.2%Pete Glidewell (Democratic) 40.8%
|-
! 
|  | 
| 
| 
| 2014
| Incumbent re-elected.
| nowrap |   (Republican) 60.9%J. Wesley Casteen (Democratic) 39.1%
|-
! 
|  | 
| 
| 
| 2012
| Incumbent re-elected.
| nowrap |   (Republican) 58.8%Thomas Mills (Democratic) 41.2%
|-
! 
|  | 
| 
| 
| 2012
| Incumbent re-elected.
| nowrap |   (Republican) 58.2%Christian Cano (Democratic) 41.8%
|-
! 
|  | 
| 
| 
| 2004
| Incumbent re-elected.
| nowrap |   (Republican) 63.1%Andy Millard (Democratic) 36.9%
|-
! 
|  | 
| 
| 
| 2012
| Incumbent re-elected.
| nowrap |   (Republican) 64.1%Rick Bryson (Democratic) 35.9%
|-
! 
|  | 
| 
| 
| 2014
| Incumbent re-elected.
| nowrap |   (Democratic) 67.0%Leon Threatt (Republican) 33.0%
|-
! 
|  | 
| colspan=3|None 
|  | New seat.New member elected.Republican gain.
| nowrap |   (Republican) 56.1%Bruce Davis (Democratic) 43.9%
|}

North Dakota 

|-
! 
|  | 
| Kevin Cramer
| 
| 2012
| Incumbent re-elected
| nowrap |   (Republican) 69.1%Chase Iron Eyes (Democratic) 23.8%Jack Seaman (Libertarian) 7.0%
|}

Ohio 

|-
! 
|  | 
| 
| 
| 19942008 2010
| Incumbent re-elected.
| nowrap |   (Republican) 59.2%Michele Young (Democratic) 40.8%
|-
! 
|  | 
| 
| 
| 2012
| Incumbent re-elected.
| nowrap |   (Republican) 65.0%William R. Smith (Democratic) 32.8%
|-
! 
|  | 
| 
| 
| 2012
| Incumbent re-elected.
| nowrap |   (Democratic) 68.6%John Adams (Republican) 31.4%
|-
! 
|  | 
| 
| 
| 2006
| Incumbent re-elected.
| nowrap |   (Republican) 68.0%Janet Garrett (Democratic) 32.0%
|-
! 
|  | 
| 
| 
| 2006
| Incumbent re-elected.
| nowrap |   (Republican) 70.9%James L. Neu Jr. (Democratic) 29.1%
|-
! 
|  | 
| 
| 
| 2010
| Incumbent re-elected.
| nowrap |   (Republican) 70.7%Michael Lorentz (Democratic) 29.3%
|-
! 
|  | 
| 
| 
| 2010
| Incumbent re-elected.
| nowrap |   (Republican) 64.0%Roy Rich (Democratic) 29.0%Dan Phillip (Independent) 7.0%
|-
! 
|  | 
| 
| 
| 2016
| Incumbent re-elected.
| nowrap |   (Republican) 68.8%Steven Fought (Democratic) 27.0%Derrick James Hendricks (Green) 4.3%
|-
! 
|  | 
| 
| 
| 1982
| Incumbent re-elected.
| nowrap |   (Democratic) 68.7%Donald Larson (Republican) 31.3%
|-
! 
|  | 
| 
| 
| 2002
| Incumbent re-elected.
| nowrap |   (Republican) 64.1%Robert Klepinger (Democratic) 32.7%Tom McMasters (Independent) 3.2%
|-
! 
|  | 
| 
| 
| 2006
| Incumbent re-elected.
| nowrap |   (Democratic) 80.3%Beverly A. Goldstein (Republican) 19.8%
|-
! 
|  | 
| 
| 
| 2000
| Incumbent re-elected.
| nowrap |   (Republican) 66.6%Ed Albertson (Democratic) 29.8%Joe Manchik (Green) 3.6%
|-
! 
|  | 
| 
| 
| 2002
| Incumbent re-elected.
| nowrap |   (Democratic) 67.7%Richard Morckel (Republican) 32.3%
|-
! 
|  | 
| 
| 
| 2012
| Incumbent re-elected.
| nowrap |   (Republican) 62.6%Michael Wager (Democratic) 37.4%
|-
! 
|  | 
| 
| 
| 2010
| Incumbent re-elected.
| nowrap |   (Republican) 66.2%Scott Wharton (Democratic) 33.8%
|-
! 
|  | 
| 
| 
| 2010
| Incumbent re-elected.
| nowrap |   (Republican) 65.3%Keith Mundy (Democratic) 34.7%
|}

Oklahoma 

|-
! 
|  | 
| 
| 
| 2012
| Incumbent re-elected.
| nowrap |   (Republican) 100%
|-
! 
|  | 
| 
| 
| 2012
| Incumbent re-elected.
| nowrap |   (Republican) 70.6%Joshua Harris-Till (Democratic) 23.2%
|-
! 
|  | 
| 
| 
| 1994
| Incumbent re-elected.
| nowrap |   (Republican) 78.3%Frankie Robbins (Democratic) 21.7%
|-
! 
|  | 
| 
| 
| 2002
| Incumbent re-elected.
| nowrap |   (Republican) 69.6%Christina Owen (Democratic) 26.1%Sevier White (Libertarian) 4.3%
|-
! 
|  | 
| 
| 
| 2014
| Incumbent re-elected.
| nowrap |   (Republican) 57.1%Al McAffrey (Democratic) 36.8%Zachary Knight (Libertarian) 6.1%
|}

Oregon 

|-
! 
|  | 
| 
| 
| 2012
| Incumbent re-elected.
| nowrap |   (Democratic) 59.6%Brian Heinrich (Republican) 37.0%Kyle Sheahan (Libertarian) 3.2%
|-
! 
|  | 
| 
| 
| 1998
| Incumbent re-elected.
| nowrap |   (Republican) 71.7%Jim Crary (Democratic) 28.0%
|-
! 
|  | 
| 
| 
| 1996
| Incumbent re-elected.
| nowrap |   (Democratic) 71.8%
|-
! 
|  | 
| 
| 
| 1986
| Incumbent re-elected.
| nowrap |   (Democratic) 55.5%Art Robinson (Republican) 39.7%Gil Guthrie (Libertarian) 1.6%Michael Beilstein (Green) 3.0%
|-
! 
| 
| 
| 
| 2008
| Incumbent re-elected.
| nowrap |   (Democratic) 53.5%Colm Willis (Republican) 43.0%
|}

Pennsylvania 

|-
! 
|  | 
| 
| 
| 1998
| Incumbent re-elected.
| nowrap |   (Democratic) 82.2%Deborah Williams (Republican) 17.8%
|-
! 
|  | 
| colspan=3 |Vacant
|  | Incumbent Chaka Fattah (D) resigned June 23, 2016.New member elected.Democratic hold.Winner was also elected to fill unexpired term, see above.
| nowrap |   (Democratic) 90.2%James Jones (Republican) 9.8%
|-
! 
|  | 
| 
| 
| 2010
| Incumbent re-elected.
| nowrap |   (Republican) 100%
|-
! 
|  | 
| 
| 
| 2012
| Incumbent re-elected.
| nowrap |   (Republican) 66.1%Joshua Burkholder (Democratic) 33.9%
|-
! 
|  | 
| 
| 
| 2008
| Incumbent re-elected.
| nowrap |   (Republican) 67.2%Kerith Strano Taylor (Democratic) 32.8%
|-
! 
|  | 
| 
| 
| 2014
| Incumbent re-elected.
| nowrap |   (Republican) 57.3%Mike Parrish (Democratic) 42.7%
|-
! 
|  | 
| 
| 
| 2010
| Incumbent re-elected.
| nowrap |   (Republican) 59.5%Mary Ellen Balchunis (Democratic) 40.5%
|-
! 
|  | 
| 
| 
| 20042006 2010
|  | Incumbent retired.New member elected.Republican hold.
| nowrap |   (Republican) 54.4%Steve Santarsiero (Democratic) 45.6%
|-
! 
|  | 
| 
| 
| 2002
| Incumbent re-elected.
| nowrap |   (Republican) 63.4%Art Halvorson (Democratic) 36.6%
|-
! 
|  | 
| 
| 
| 2010
| Incumbent re-elected.
| nowrap |   (Republican) 70.2%Mike Molesevich (Democratic) 29.8%
|-
! 
|  | 
| 
| 
| 2010
| Incumbent re-elected.
| nowrap |   (Republican) 63.7%Michael Marsicano (Democratic) 36.3%
|-
! 
|  | 
| 
| 
| 2012
| Incumbent re-elected.
| nowrap |   (Republican) 61.8%Erin McClelland (Democratic) 38.2%
|-
! 
|  | 
| 
| 
| 2014
| Incumbent re-elected.
| nowrap |   (Democratic) 100%
|-
! 
|  | 
| 
| 
| 1994
| Incumbent re-elected.
| nowrap |   (Democratic) 74.4%Lenny McAllister (Republican) 25.6%
|-
! 
|  | 
| 
| 
| 2004
| Incumbent re-elected.
| nowrap |   (Republican) 58.4%Rick Daugherty (Democratic) 38.0%Paul Rizzo (Libertarian) 3.6%
|-
! 
|  | 
| 
| 
| 1996
|  | Incumbent retired.New member elected.Republican hold.
| nowrap |   (Republican) 53.8%Christina Hartman (Democratic) 42.9%Shawn House (Libertarian) 3.4%
|-
! 
|  | 
| 
| 
| 2012
| Incumbent re-elected.
| nowrap |   (Democratic) 53.8%Matt Connolly (Republican) 46.2%
|-
! 
|  | 
| 
| 
| 2002
| Incumbent re-elected.
| nowrap |   (Republican) 100%
|}

Rhode Island 

|-
! 
|  | 
| 
| 
| 2010
| Incumbent re-elected.
| nowrap |   (Democratic) 64.5%H. Russell Taub (Republican) 35.1%
|-
! 
|  | 
| 
| 
| 2000
| Incumbent re-elected.
| nowrap |   (Democratic) 58.1%Rhue Reis (Republican) 30.7%Jeffrey Johnson (Independent) 7.1%Salvatore Caiozzo (Independent) 3.9%
|}

South Carolina 

|-
! 
|  | 
| 
| 
| 19942000 2013 
| Incumbent re-elected
| nowrap |   (Republican) 58.6%Dimitri Cherny (Democratic) 36.8%Michael Crier Jr. (Libertarian) 3.6%
|-
! 
|  | 
| 
| 
| 2001 
| Incumbent re-elected
| nowrap |   (Republican) 60.3%Arik Bjorn (Democratic) 35.9%Eddie McCain (American) 3.8%
|-
! 
|  | 
| 
| 
| 2010
| Incumbent re-elected
| nowrap |   (Republican) 72.8%Hosea Cleveland (Democratic) 27.1%
|-
! 
|  | 
| 
| 
| 2010
| Incumbent re-elected
| nowrap |   (Republican) 67.2%Chris Fedalei (Democratic) 31.0%Michael Chandler (Constitution) 1.7%
|-
! 
|  | 
| 
| 
| 2010
| Incumbent re-elected
| nowrap |   (Republican) 59.2%Fran Person (Democratic) 38.7%Rudy Barnes Jr. (American) 2.0%
|-
! 
|  | 
| 
| 
| 1992
| Incumbent re-elected
| nowrap |   (Democratic) 70.1%Laura Sterling (Republican) 27.6%Rich Piotrowski (Libertarian) 1.2%Prince Mallory (Green) 1.0%
|-
! 
|  | 
| 
| 
| 2012
| Incumbent re-elected
| nowrap |   (Republican) 61.0%Mal Hyman (Democratic) 39.0%
|}

South Dakota 

|-
! 
|  | 
| Kristi Noem
| 
| 2010
| Incumbent re-elected.
| nowrap |   (Republican) 64.1%Paula Hawks (Democratic) 35.9%
|}

Tennessee 

|-
! 
|  | 
| 
| 
| 2008
| Incumbent re-elected.
| nowrap |   (Republican) 78.4%Alam Bohms (Democratic) 15.4%Robert Franklin (Independent) 6.2%
|-
! 
|  | 
| 
| 
| 1988
| Incumbent re-elected.
| nowrap |   (Republican) 75.6%Stuart Starr (Democratic) 24.4%
|-
! 
|  | 
| 
| 
| 2010
| Incumbent re-elected.
| nowrap |   (Republican) 66.4%Melody Shekari (Democratic) 28.8%Cassandra Mitchell (Independent) 1.9%Rick Tyler (Independent) 1.9%
|-
! 
|  | 
| 
| 
| 2010
| Incumbent re-elected.
| nowrap |   (Republican) 65.0%Steven Reynolds (Democratic) 35.0%
|-
! 
|  | 
| 
| 
| 19821994 2002
| Incumbent re-elected.
| nowrap |   (Democratic) 62.6%Stacy Ries Snyder (Republican) 37.4%
|-
! 
|  | 
| 
| 
| 2010
| Incumbent re-elected.
| nowrap |   (Republican) 71.1%David Kent (Democratic) 21.8%David Ross (Independent) 7.1%
|-
! 
|  | 
| 
| 
| 2002
| Incumbent re-elected.
| nowrap |   (Republican) 72.2%Tharon Chandler (Democratic) 23.5%Leonard Ladner (Independent) 4.3%
|-
! 
|  | 
| 
| 
| 2010
|  | Incumbent retired.New member elected.Republican hold.
| nowrap |   (Republican) 68.8%Rickey Hobson (Democratic) 25.1%Shelia Godwin (Independent) 2.3%James Hart (Independent) 1.4%
|-
! 
|  | 
| 
| 
| 2006
| Incumbent re-elected.
| nowrap |   (Democratic) 78.7%Paul Cook (Independent) 2.4%Wayne Alberson (Republican) 18.9%
|}

Texas 

|-
! 
|  | 
| 
| 
| 2004
| Incumbent re-elected.
| nowrap |   (Republican) 73.9%Shirley McKellar (Democratic) 24.1%Phil Gray (Libertarian) 1.9%
|-
! 
|  | 
| 
| 
| 2004
| Incumbent re-elected.
| nowrap |   (Republican) 60.6%Pat Bryan (Democratic) 36.0%James B. Veasaw (Libertarian) 2.3%Joshua Darr (Green) 1.0%
|-
! 
|  | 
| 
| 
| 1991
| Incumbent re-elected.
| nowrap |   (Republican) 61.2%Adam Bell (Democratic) 34.6%Scott Jameson (Libertarian) 3.3%
|-
! 
|  | 
| 
| 
| 2014
| Incumbent re-elected.
| nowrap |   (Republican) 88.0%Cody Wommack (Libertarian) 12.0%
|-
! 
|  | 
| 
| 
| 2002
| Incumbent re-elected.
| nowrap |   (Republican) 80.6%Ken Ashby (Libertarian) 19.4%
|-
! 
|  | 
| 
| 
| 1984
| Incumbent re-elected.
| nowrap |   (Republican) 58.3%Ruby Fay Woolridge (Democratic) 39.0%Darrel Smith Jr. (Green) 2.6%
|-
! 
|  | 
| 
| 
| 2000
| Incumbent re-elected.
| nowrap |   (Republican) 56.2%James Cargas (Democratic) 43.8%
|-
! 
|  | 
| 
| 
| 1996
| Incumbent re-elected.
| nowrap |   (Republican) 100%
|-
! 
|  | 
| 
| 
| 2004
| Incumbent re-elected.
| nowrap |   (Democratic) 80.6%Jeff Martin (Republican) 19.4%
|-
! 
|  | 
| 
| 
| 2004
| Incumbent re-elected.
| nowrap |   (Republican) 57.3%Tawana Walter-Cadien (Democratic) 38.4%Bill Kelsey (Libertarian) 4.2%
|-
! 
|  | 
| 
| 
| 2004
| Incumbent re-elected.
| nowrap |   (Republican) 89.5%Nicholas Landholt (Libertarian) 10.5%
|-
! 
|  | 
| 
| 
| 1996
| Incumbent re-elected.
| nowrap |   (Republican) 69.4%Bill Bradshaw (Democratic) 26.9%Ed Colliver (Libertarian) 3.8%
|-
! 
|  | 
| 
| 
| 1994
| Incumbent re-elected.
| nowrap |   (Republican) 90.0%Calvin DeWeese (Libertarian) 6.7%H.F. "Rusty" Tomlinson (Green) 3.4%
|-
! 
|  | 
| 
| 
| 2012
| Incumbent re-elected.
| nowrap |   (Republican) 61.9%Michael Cole (Democratic) 38.1%
|-
! 
|  | 
| 
| 
| 1996
|  | Incumbent retired.New member elected.Democratic hold.
| nowrap |   (Democratic) 57.3%Tim Westley (Republican) 37.7%Ross Lynn Leone (Libertarian) 1.9%Vanessa Tijerina (Green) 3.1%
|-
! 
|  | 
| 
| 
| 2012
| Incumbent re-elected.
| nowrap |   (Democratic) 85.7%Jaime O. Perez (Libertarian) 10.0%Mary Gourdoux (Green) 4.3%
|-
! 
|  | 
| 
| 
| 2010
| Incumbent re-elected.
| nowrap |   (Republican) 60.8%William Matta (Democratic) 35.2%Clark Patterson (Libertarian) 4.0%
|-
! 
|  | 
| 
| 
| 1994
| Incumbent re-elected.
| nowrap |   (Democratic) 73.5%Lori Bartley (Republican) 23.6%Thomas Kleven (Green) 2.9%
|-
! 
|  | 
| 
| 
| 2003
|  | Incumbent retired.New member elected.Republican hold.
| nowrap |   (Republican) 86.7%Troy Bonar (Libertarian) 8.5%Mark Lawson (Green) 4.8%
|-
! 
|  | 
| 
| 
| 2012
| Incumbent re-elected.
| nowrap |   (Democratic) 79.7%Jeffrey C. Blunt (Libertarian) 15.5%Paul Pipkin (Green) 4.8%
|-
! 
|  | 
| 
| 
| 1986
| Incumbent re-elected.
| nowrap |   (Republican) 57.0%Tommy Wakely (Democratic) 36.5%Mark Loewe (Libertarian) 4.1%Antonio Diaz (Green) 2.4%
|-
! 
|  | 
| 
| 
| 2008
| Incumbent re-elected.
| nowrap |   (Republican) 59.5%Mark Gibson (Democratic) 40.5%
|-
! 
|  | 
| 
| 
| 2014
| Incumbent re-elected.
| nowrap |   (Republican) 48.3%Pete Gallego (Democratic) 47.0%Ruben S. Corvalan (Libertarian) 4.7%
|-
! 
|  | 
| 
| 
| 2004
| Incumbent re-elected.
| nowrap |   (Republican) 56.2%Jan McDowell (Democratic) 39.3%Mike Kolls (Libertarian) 3.1%Kevin McCormick (Green) 1.4%
|-
! 
|  | 
| 
| 
| 2012
| Incumbent re-elected.
| nowrap |   (Republican) 58.4%Kathi Thomas (Democratic) 37.7%Loren Marc Schneiderman (Libertarian) 3.9%
|-
! 
|  | 
| 
| 
| 2002
| Incumbent re-elected.
| nowrap |   (Republican) 66.4%Eric Mauck (Democratic) 29.6%Mark Boler (Libertarian) 4.0%
|-
! 
|  | 
| 
| 
| 2010
| Incumbent re-elected.
| nowrap |   (Republican) 61.7%Roy Barrera (Democratic) 38.3%
|-
! 
|  | 
| 
| 
| 2004
| Incumbent re-elected.
| nowrap |   (Democratic) 66.2%Zeffen Hardin (Republican) 31.3%Michael D. Cary (Green) 2.5%
|-
! 
|  | 
| 
| 
| 1992
| Incumbent re-elected.
| nowrap |   (Democratic) 72.5%Julio Garza (Republican) 24.0%N. Ruben Perez (Libertarian) 2.5%James Partsch-Galvan (Green) 1.1%
|-
! 
|  | 
| 
| 
| 1992
| Incumbent re-elected.
| nowrap |   (Democratic) 77.9%Charles Lingerfelt (Republican) 19.0%Jarrett R. Woods (Libertarian) 2.2%
|-
! 
|  | 
| 
| 
| 2002
| Incumbent re-elected.
| nowrap |   (Republican) 58.4%Mike Clark (Democratic) 36.5%Scott Ballard (Libertarian) 5.2%
|-
! 
|  | 
| 
| 
| 1996
| Incumbent re-elected.
| nowrap |   (Republican) 71.1%Ed Rankin (Libertarian) 19.0%Gary Stuard (Green) 10.0%
|-
! 
|  | 
| 
| 
| 2012
| Incumbent re-elected.
| nowrap |   (Democratic) 73.7%Mark Mitchell (Republican) 26.3%
|-
! 
|  | 
| 
| 
| 2012
| Incumbent re-elected.
| nowrap |   (Democratic) 62.7%Rey Gonzalez (Republican) 37.3%
|-
! 
|  | 
| 
| 
| 1994
| Incumbent re-elected.
| nowrap |   (Democratic) 63.1%Susan Narvaiz (Republican) 31.6%Rhett Rosenquest Smith (Libertarian) 3.3%Scott Trimble (Green) 2.1%
|-
! 
|  | 
| 
| 
| 2014
| Incumbent re-elected.
| nowrap |   (Republican) 88.6%Hal Ridley Jr. (Green) 11.4%
|}

Utah 

|-
! 
|  | 
| 
| 
| 2002
| Incumbent re-elected.
| nowrap |   (Republican) 65.9%Peter Clemens (Democratic) 26.4%Craig Bowden (Libertarian) 5.9%Chadwick Fairbanks III (Unaffiliated) 1.7%
|-
! 
|  | 
| 
| 
| 2012
| Incumbent re-elected.
| nowrap |   (Republican) 61.6%Charlene Albarran (Democratic) 33.9%Paul J. McCollaum Jr. (Constitution) 4.5%
|-
! 
|  | 
| 
| 
| 2008
| Incumbent re-elected.
| nowrap |   (Republican) 73.5%Stephen Tryon (Democratic) 26.5%
|-
! 
|  | 
| 
| 
| 2014
| Incumbent re-elected.
| nowrap |   (Republican) 53.8%Doug Owens (Democratic) 41.3%Collin R. Simonsen (Constitution) 4.9%
|}

Vermont 

|-
! 
|  | 
| Peter Welch
| 
| 2006
| Incumbent re-elected.
| nowrap |   (Democratic) 82.5%Erica Clawson (Liberty Union) 9.2%
|}

Virginia 

|-
! 
|  | 
| 
| 
| 2007
| Incumbent re-elected.
| nowrap |   (Republican) 59.9%Matt Rowe (Democratic) 36.6%Glenda Parker (Independent) 3.4%
|-
! rowspan=2 | 
| rowspan=2  | 
| 
| 
| 2010
|  | Incumbent retired.New member elected.Republican hold.
| rowspan=2 nowrap |   (Republican) 61.3%Shaun D. Brown (Democratic) 38.5%
|-
| Randy Forbes
| 
| 2001
|  | Incumbent lost renomination.Republican loss.

|-
! 
|  | 
| 
| 
| 1992
| Incumbent re-elected.
| nowrap |   (Democratic) 66.7%Marty Williams (Republican) 33.1%
|-
! 
|  | 
| colspan=3|None 
|  | New seat.New member elected.Democratic gain.
| nowrap |   (Democratic) 57.7%Mike Wade (Republican) 42.0%
|-
! 
|  | 
| 
| 
| 2010
|  | Incumbent retired.New member elected.Republican hold.
| nowrap |   (Republican) 58.2%Jane Dittmar (Democratic) 41.6%
|-
! 
|  | 
| 
| 
| 1992
| Incumbent re-elected.
| nowrap |   (Republican) 66.6%Kai Degner (Democratic) 33.2%
|-
! 
|  | 
| 
| 
| 2014
| Incumbent re-elected.
| nowrap |   (Republican) 57.5%Eileen Bedell (Democratic) 42.2%
|-
! 
|  | 
| 
| 
| 2014
| Incumbent re-elected.
| nowrap |   (Democratic) 68.4%Charles Hernick (Republican) 27.3%Julio Gracia (Independent) 4.1%
|-
! 
|  | 
| 
| 
| 2010
| Incumbent re-elected.
| nowrap |   (Republican) 68.6%Derek Kitts (Democratic) 28.3%Janice Boyd (Independent) 2.9%
|-
! 
|  | 
| 
| 
| 2014
| Incumbent re-elected.
| nowrap |   (Republican) 52.7%LuAnn Bennett (Democratic) 46.9%
|-
! 
|  | 
| 
| 
| 2008
| Incumbent re-elected.
| nowrap |   (Democratic) 87.9%
|}

Washington 

|-
! 
|  | 
| 
| 
| 2012
| Incumbent re-elected.
| nowrap |   (Democratic) 55.4%Robert Sutherland (Republican) 44.6%
|-
! 
|  | 
| 
| 
| 2000
| Incumbent re-elected.
| nowrap |   (Democratic) 64.0%Marc Hennemann (Republican) 36.0%
|-
! 
|  | 
| 
| 
| 2010
| Incumbent re-elected.
| nowrap |   (Republican) 61.8%Jim Moeller (Democratic) 38.2%
|-
! 
|  | 
| 
| 
| 2014
| Incumbent re-elected.
| nowrap |   (Republican) 57.6%Clint Didier (Republican) 42.4%
|-
! 
|  | 
| 
| 
| 2004
| Incumbent re-elected.
| nowrap |   (Republican) 59.6%Joe Pakootas (Democratic) 40.4%
|-
! 
|  | 
| 
| 
| 2012
| Incumbent re-elected.
| nowrap |   (Democratic) 61.5%Todd Bloom (Republican) 38.5%
|-
! 
|  | 
| 
| 
| 1988
|  | Incumbent retired.New member elected.Democratic hold.
| nowrap |   (Democratic) 56.0%Brady Walkinshaw (Democratic) 44.0%
|-
! 
|  | 
| 
| 
| 2004
| Incumbent re-elected.
| nowrap |   (Republican) 60.2%Tony Ventrella (Democratic) 39.8%
|-
! 
|  | 
| 
| 
| 1996
| Incumbent re-elected.
| nowrap |   (Democratic) 72.9%Doug Basler (Republican) 27.1%
|-
! 
|  | 
| 
| 
| 2012
| Incumbent re-elected.
| nowrap |   (Democratic) 58.7%Jim Postma (Republican) 41.3%
|}

West Virginia 

|-
! 
|  | 
| 
| 
| 2010
| Incumbent re-elected.
| nowrap |   (Republican) 69.0%Mike Manypenny (Democratic) 31.0%
|-
! 
|  | 
| 
| 
| 2014
| Incumbent re-elected.
| nowrap |   (Republican) 58.2%Mark Hunt (Democratic) 41.8%
|-
! 
|  | 
| 
| 
| 2014
| Incumbent re-elected.
| nowrap |   (Republican) 67.9%Matt Detch (Democratic) 24.0%Zane Lawhorn (Libertarian) 8.1%
|}

Wisconsin 

|-
! 
|  | 
| 
| 
| 1998
| Incumbent re-elected.
| nowrap |   (Republican) 65.0%Ryan Solen (Democratic) 30.2%Jason LeBeck (Libertarian) 2.1%
|-
! 
|  | 
| 
| 
| 2012
| Incumbent re-elected.
| nowrap |   (Democratic) 68.7%Peter Theron (Republican) 31.2%
|-
! 
|  | 
| 
| 
| 1996
| Incumbent re-elected.
| nowrap |   (Democratic) 98.9%
|-
! 
|  | 
| 
| 
| 2004
| Incumbent re-elected.
| nowrap |   (Democratic) 76.7%Andy Craig (Libertarian) 11.2%Robert Raymond (Independent) 11.7%
|-
! 
|  | 
| 
| 
| 1978
| Incumbent re-elected.
| nowrap |   (Republican) 66.7%Khary Penebaker (Democratic) 29.3%John Arndt (Libertarian) 3.9%
|-
! 
|  | 
| 
| 
| 2014
| Incumbent re-elected.
| nowrap |   (Republican) 57.2%Sarah Lloyd (Democratic) 37.3%Jeff Dahlke (Independent) 5.5%
|-
! 
|  | 
| 
| 
| 2010
| Incumbent re-elected.
| nowrap |   (Republican) 61.7%Mary Hoeft (Democratic) 38.3%
|-
! 
|  | 
| 
| 
| 2010
|  | Incumbent retired.New member elected.Republican hold.
| nowrap |   (Republican) 62.7%Tom Nelson (Democratic) 37.3%
|}

Wyoming 

|-
! 
|  | 
| Cynthia Lummis
| 
| 2008
|  | Incumbent retired.New member elected.Republican hold.
| nowrap |   (Republican) 60.3%Ryan Greene (Democratic) 29.2%Daniel Clyde Cummings (Constitution) 4.0%Lawrence Struempf (Libertarian) 3.5%
|}

Non-voting delegates 

|-
! 
| Aumua Amata Radewagen
| 
| 2014
| Incumbent re-elected.
| nowrap |  Amata Coleman Radewagen (Republican) 75.4%Salu Hunkin-Finau (Democratic) 13.4%Mapu Jamias (Democratic) 8.3%Meleagi Suitonu-Chapman (Democratic) 1.5%
|-
! 
| Eleanor Holmes Norton
| 
| 1990
| Incumbent re-elected.
| nowrap |  Eleanor Holmes Norton (Democratic) 88.1%Martin Moulton (Libertarian) 6.2%Natale Stracuzzi (Green) 4.8%
|-
! 
| Madeleine Bordallo
| 
| 2002
| Incumbent re-elected.
| nowrap |  Madeleine Bordallo (Democratic) 53.7%Felix Camacho (Republican) 45.7%
|-
! 
| Gregorio Sablan
|  | Independent
| 2008
| Incumbent re-elected.
| nowrap |  Gregorio Sablan (Independent)
|-
! 
| Pedro Pierluisi
|  | New Progressive/Democratic
| 2008
| |Incumbent retired to run for Governor.New resident commissioner elected.New Progressive hold.Republican gain.
| nowrap |  Jenniffer González (New Progressive/Republican) 48.8%Héctor Ferrer (Popular Democratic/Democratic) 47.2%Hugo Rodríguez (Puerto Rican Independence) 2.7%Mariana Nogales Molinelli (Working People's) 1.3%
|-
! 
| Stacey Plaskett
| 
| 2014
| Incumbent re-elected.
| nowrap |  Stacey Plaskett (Democratic)
|}

See also 
 2016 United States elections
 2016 United States gubernatorial elections
 2016 United States presidential election
 2016 United States Senate elections
 114th United States Congress
 115th United States Congress

Notes

References 

 
November 2016 events in the United States